The Frankston Independent School District is a public school district based in Frankston, Texas (USA).

The district is located in northeastern Anderson County and extends into southeastern Henderson County, including the town of Berryville and some of the town of Coffee City.

In 2009, the school district was rated "academically acceptable" by the Texas Education Agency.

Schools
Frankston ISD has three schools:

Frankston High School (Grades 9-12)
Frankston Middle School (Grades 6-8)
Frankston Elementary School (Grades PK-5)

References

External links
 

School districts in Anderson County, Texas
School districts in Henderson County, Texas